The Hylestad Stave Church was a stave church located in Hylestad (now Valle municipality), Setesdal district, Norway. The church was estimated to have been built in the late 12th to the early 13th century and was demolished in the 17th century. Some of the intricate wood carvings from the church doorway were saved and incorporated into other buildings. They are now on display at the Museum of Cultural History in Oslo.

The carvings show several scenes from the legend of Sigurd Fåvnesbane. A section of one of these carvings in which Sigurd kills Regin was the basis for a Norwegian postal stamp.

Engravings 
There are seven scenes from the Sigurd legend carved on the two door panels, with three scenes on the first panel and four scenes on the second panel. The description below notes the scenes and the corresponding section from the legend, with the order of the fifth and sixth scenes reversed to follow the normal sequence of the legend.

Based on the clothes and equipment, the panels have been dated to the second half of the 12th century. The figures and medallions on Hylestad I and the vine on Hylestad II show close parallels to English and French manuscript illuminations from around 1170.

Sigurd and Regin forge the sword Gram 
The first scene shows Sigurd (who wears a helmet) and Regin (who has a beard) at the forge and the second scene shows Sigurd holding the mended sword.

Sigurd, described as one of the best swordsmen, was urged by Regin to seek Fafnir the dragon's treasure. Regin then forged a sword with Sigurd at his side, providing assistance by keeping the fire going and providing water to cool the blade when needed. When the sword was completed they named it Gram. Sigurd tested the sword by striking it upon Regin's shield, which had a picture of Fafnir engraved on it. The blade broke, which prompted Regin to forge another sword out of the broken pieces of the first Gram. When it was completed Sigurd tested the blade once again on the shield with Fafnir's image, and this time it cut through the shield and also cut off the horn of the anvil.

Sigurd slays Fafnir the dragon 

The third scene shows Sirgurd slaying the dragon with a sword.

After forging the sword, Sigurd and Regin travel to Gnita-Heath in order to find Fafnir the dragon and take his treasure. There they dig "a pit in the path used by Fafnir," and then he crawled into it. When Fafnir came to the water pit Sigurd emerged and "thrust his sword" into Fafnir, killing him.

Sigurd roasts the heart of the dragon 
The fourth scene, which is on the second door panel, shows Sigurd roasting the heart of the dragon and sucking his thumb while Ragin appears to sleep.

After slaying Fafnir, Regin asks Sigurd to take the dragon's heart and roast it for him. "Regin then lay down, drank Fafnir's blood and went to sleep." Sigurd himself then touched the heart to see if it was cooked, but the boiling blood ran down his hand, scalding him. When he drank the dragon's blood, he was able to hear "the speech of birds." From the birds, which are depicted in the fifth scene, he heard of Regin's plot to kill Sigurd, in "vengeance for his brother."

Sigurd kills Regin 

In the sixth scene, Sigurd slays Regin with his sword.

Sigurd, both warned by the birds of Regin's plot to betray him and encouraged by their assertions that great wealth, knowledge, and power would be his if he killed Regin preemptively and took possession of Fafnir's treasure, kills Regin. Sigurd, convinced by their counsel, states "It will not be my ill fate that Regin shall be my death. Rather, both brothers should go the same way." Sigurd decapitates Regin using the sword Gram.

Grani carries the treasure 
In the fifth scene, Sigurd's horse Grani stands carrying a chest containing Fafnir's expansive treasure and two birds are depicted below Grani perched in the branches of a tree. The birds likely belong to the group whose speech Sigurd understood. This scene combines elements of the legend that took place before and after the slaying of Regin.

After killing Regin, Sigurd mounts Grani, and rides to Fafnir's lair, where he finds "an enormous store of gold" from which he takes "many precious things" including the helm of terror and the sword Hrotti specifically. Sigurd loads large chests with the treasure onto Grani, despite expecting that it would be too large a load even for a pair of horses. Grani carries the treasure without difficulty, even refusing to move until Sigurd rides on his back, running "as if unencumbered."

Gunnar in the serpent pit 
The last panel shows Sigurd's brother-in-law, Gunnar, in a snake pit playing the harp with his feet in an attempt to pacify the snakes.

Fafnir's treasure is cursed.  In his dying breaths, Fafnir warns Sigurd that his gold "will be the death of all that possess it." Sigurd, is unfazed by this and mentions the mortality of all men.  After Sigurd's death at the hands of his three brothers-in-law, Gunnar, Hogni, and Guttorm, Fafnir's treasure is hidden by Gunnar, sunk to the bottom of the Rhine.  Gudrun remarries, to Atli (Atilla the Hun), who is fascinated by the treasure and seeks to own it.  Gunnar refuses to tell Atli its location, insisting, "Rather shall the Rhine rule over the gold than the Huns wear it on their arms." Atli orders Gunnar to be placed into a serpent pit, with his hands bound behind his back.  Gudrun sends her brother a harp, and Gunnar is able to play "so exceedingly well" with his toes that he lulls the snakes to sleep, "except for one large and hideous adder" who kills Gunnar in a single strike.

See also 
 Sigurd stones
 Volsung cycle

References 

Viking art
Stave churches in Norway
Setesdal